Deva Matha College, Kuravilangad, is a college for higher education, located at Kuravilangad, Kottayam, Kerala.
It was founded on 3 April 1964, under the inspiration of the Syro-Malabar Catholic Eparchy of Palai, by St.Mary's Forane Church, Kuravilangad.
The college is affiliated to Mahatma Gandhi University, Kerala. It is a NAAC re-accredited college with 'A' grade.

Departments
 English
 Commerce
 Mathematics
 Hindi
 Statistics
 Physics
 Botany
 Zoology
 Politics
 Sanskrit
 Economics
 Physical education
 Chemistry
 Malayalam

Research and Consultancy activities

The college has distinguished itself in Research and consultancy activities. Deparyment of Malayalam became an approved research centre in 2004.In 2013 the Department of English also became an approved Research centre. Over the years college bagged 50 university ranks.

Accreditation
The college is recognized by University Grants Commission.It is NAAC re-accredited college with A grade.

Notable alumni
 Dennis Joseph, Indian scriptwriter
Santhosh George Kulangara, Indian television producer, director, broadcaster, publisher, and traveller.
 Victor George, Former Chief Photographer of Malayala Manorama
 Dr. V A Joseph , Former CEO & Managing Director of South Indian Bank
 Thomas Chazhikadan, Member of Parliament of Kottayam
 Dr. Tharsis Joseph , Deputy Managing Director of Deepika Newspaper & Former Principal of the College
 Mar Jacob Muricken , Former Auxiliary Bishop of Diocese of Pala

References

List of colleges affiliated with Mahatma Gandhi University, Kerala

External links
 
 
 

Colleges affiliated to Mahatma Gandhi University, Kerala
Universities and colleges in Kottayam
Educational institutions established in 1957
1957 establishments in Kerala